The Annual Report is a second comedy studio album by New Zealand satirist John Clarke and Australian Bryan Dawe. The album was released in November 1991 and peaked at number 94 on The Australian ARIA Charts. The interviews first broadcast on A Current Affair on the Nine Network.

At the ARIA Music Awards of 1992 the album won the ARIA Award for Best Comedy Release; the duo's second consecutive win in this category.

Track listing
 "Religious Instruction" - The Hon. Bob Hawke, Prime Minister	
 "A Working Class Boy" - The Hon. John Hewson, Leader of the Australian Liberal Party	
 "The Banking Inquiry" - The Hon. Paul Keating, Federal Treasurer	
 "Attracting the Green Vote" - The Hon. Bob Hawke, Prime Minister	
 "Trouble with Stamps" - The Hon. Charles Blunt, Leader of the National Party	
 "On the Vital Matter Of Trade - The Hon. Bob Hawke, Prime Minister	
 "The Crossword" - The Hon. Paul Keating, Federal Treasurer	
 "Protecting the Environment" - A BHP Spokesman	
 "Our Man in Dublin" - Mr. Brian Burke, Ex-Western Australian Premier, Ambassador to Eire	
 "Our Man in Perth" - Mr. Brian Burke, Ex-Western Australian Premier, Ex-Ambassador to Eire	
 "Our Man in Wonderland" - Mr. Brian Burke, Ex-Western Australian Premier, Semi-retired Witness	
 "On the Waterfront" - The Hon. John Hewson, Leader of the Australian Liberal Party	
 "A Couple of Bucks" - The Hon. Paul Keating, Federal Treasurer	
 "The Challenge" - The Hon. Bob Hawke, Prime Minister And The Hon. Paul Keating, Recently Demobbed Federal Treasurer	
 "A Very Brilliant Man" - The Hon. Jeff Kennett, Victorian Opposition Leader	
 "A Standing Ovation" - The Hon. Bob Hawke, Prime Minister	
 "Defending the Faith" - The Hon. John Kerin, Recently Appointed Federal Treasurer	
 "The Front Fell Off" - Senator Bob Collins, Minister For Shipping	
 "Consumption Tax" - The Hon. John Hewson, Leader of the Australian Liberal Party	
 "I'd Rather Not Discuss It" - The Hon. Paul Keating. Previously Federal Treasurer	
 "The Big Question" - The Hon. John Hewson, Leader of the Australian Liberal Party	
 "A Message from Spain" - Mr. Christopher Skase, Ornament to Australian Business

Charts

Release history

References

1991 albums
1990s comedy albums
Bryan Dawe albums
John Clarke (satirist) albums
Warner Records albums
ARIA Award-winning albums